Avatara Purusha may refer to:
 Avatara Purusha (1989 film), a Kannada action thriller film
 Avatara Purusha (2022 film), an Indian Kannada-language supernatural comedy thriller film